The Holy Orthodox Church in North America (HOCNA) is a True Orthodox denomination located primarily in the United States and Canada, with additional communities in Latin America, Europe, Africa, and Georgia.

History 
The starting point in the history of this jurisdiction was the Holy Transfiguration Monastery in Boston, founded in 1961 by monk Panteleimon (Metropoulos) and accepted into the ROCOR in 1965. Archimandrite Panteleimon developed missionary activity, gathered followers around him and had considerable influence on the secretary of the Synod of Bishops of the ROCOR, Bishop Gregory (Grabbe) and the First Hierarch of the ROCOR, Philaret (Voznesensky). The irreconcilable and extremely isolationist views of Archimandrite Panteleimon influenced the position of the entire ROCOR.

Bishop Jerome Shaw remembered
In 1965, a Greek-American monastery in Brookline, MA was received into the Church Abroad, with its founder, the priestmonk Panteleimon (Metropoulos<...>). That priestmonk, through followers whom he had led into his “stricter” teachings, began to undermine both the traditional practices of the Russian Church, and then the hierarchy itself. But it was a curious “strictness” that Fr. Panteleimon (Metropoulos) and his coterie applied only to others, not to themselves.

Here is an example of false “strictness:” “spiritual teachers” who claim that the Russian Church has been wrong in approving mixed marriages, and that it is better for spouses to live in sin, if one of them is not Orthodox, in or outside a secular marriage, than to enter into a “mixed marriage” as permitted by the Russian Church: since in their view a mixed marriage would be unacceptable. Thus there was a discrepancy between what the Church actually teaches or allows, and what the Church “should teach,” or “should not permit.”

At the same time, there arose conflicts between the Russian and non-Russian members and the communities of the Church Abroad. Masterfully playing his role, the Boston charlatan either made the non-Russians into his followers, or drove their communities out of ROCOR. Thanks to the direct or indirect influence of the “Boston Elder,” the Church Abroad lost four non-Russian dioceses between 1967 and 1976.

In 1986, Metropolitan Vitaly (Ustinov) was elected First Hierarch of the ROCOR. He dismissed Bishop Gregory (Grabbe) from all positions. Investigations also began into the activities of his son Archimandrite Anthony (Grabbe), and Archimandrite Panteleimon (Metropoulos), the abbot of the Holy Transfiguration Monastery in Boston, as well as the majority of the monastery's brethren, were accused of sodomy. It turned out that back in the first half of the 1980s, Metropolitan Philaret, the First Hierarch of the ROCOR, and the Synod of Bishops of the ROCOR received repeated written complaints from former residents of the monastery, Hieromonk Gregory and Monk Athanasius, who reported the unseemly behavior of Archimandrite Panteleimon towards them. However, the investigation of the circumstances of the scandalous acts of the superior of the Boston monastery was always entrusted to Bishop Gregory (Grabbe), who explained what happened by the vindictiveness and slander of the monks who left the monastery. When the investigation began, new witnesses and even victims from among the former inhabitants appeared, claiming about the heavy atmosphere of unnatural vice that reigned in the monastery. On May 29, 1986, the accusers and the accused were summoned to a meeting of the Synod of Bishops. Archimandrite Panteleimon categorically denied all the charges against him and asked the Synod to dismiss him. A decision was made to dismiss Archimandrite Panteleimon, and Hieromonk Isaac and Hieromonk Ephraim, who were suspected of sodomy, were forbidden to act as candidates for the position of abbot of the monastery. Contrary to the synodal definition, the brethren of the Transfiguration of the Saviour Monastery elected Hieromonk Isaac as the new abbot.

On November 25, 1986, the issue of the illegal election of Hieromonk Isaac became the subject of consideration at the Synod of Bishops of the ROCOR, which banned Archimandrite Panteleimon and Hieromonk Isaac from the priesthood until the final resolution of the issue by the Bishops' Council of the ROCOR. Without waiting for the end of the trial procedure, the monastery hastily left the jurisdiction of the ROCOR, as reported in a letter from the secretary of the monastery of schema Monk Ephraim to Metropolitan Vitaly dated December 8 of the same year. The brethren of the monastery declared themselves as innocent victims of malicious slander, and Archimandrite Panteleimon and his supporters justified their conflict with the new leadership of the ROCOR, and then their departure from it, by dogmatic differences with the Synod of the ROCOR, including accusing the latter of having "irreversibly deviated into ecumenism"; they considered contacts with the Serbian and Jerusalem Patriarchates as "ecumenism".

They moved to the Auxentius Synod of the Church of Genuine Orthodox Christians of Greece. Archimandrite Panteleimon was followed by a total of 25 priests and eight deacons. In addition, the "French Mission" ("The Orthodox Church of France") headed by Archimandrite Ambrose (Fontrier) withdrew from the jurisdiction of the ROCOR. In 1989, Bishop Macarius of Toronto and Bishop Ephraim of Boston were ordained by the hierarchs of the Auxentius Synod of the Church of the GOC of Greece for the Boston Monastery and American parishes, forming the Holy Orthodox Church of North America ("Boston Synod"), an autonomous structure within the Auxentius Synod of the Church of the GOC of Greece.

In 1996, after the death of the Archbishop Auxentius (Pastras) of Athens, the American hierarchs had a conflict with the new "Archbishop of Athens" Maxim (Vallianatos), after which the Macarius and Ephraim turned to Metropolitan Athanasius (Postalas) of Larissa with a proposal to head the Synod. However, in the autumn of 1996, they had already ordained two bishops on their own and broke off communication with Athanasius. The American bishops declared their church autocephalous and called it the "Holy Orthodox Church of North America". At the same time, they considered themselves as a Synod of the Church of the Greek Orthodox Church, despite the fact that only one monastery was subordinate to them on the territory of Greece itself.

Structure 

 Holy Orthodox Metropolis of Boston (HOMB)
 Holy Orthodox Metropolis of Toronto
Holy Orthodox Metropolis of Seattle

References

References

External links
 Official HOCNA websites
 Holy Orthodox Metropolis of Boston
 Holy Transfiguration Monastery
 Holy Orthodox Metropolis of Seattle
 Holy Orthodox Metropolis of Toronto

Eastern Orthodoxy in North America
Christian denominations established in the 20th century
Christian organizations established in 1987
True Orthodox denominations